The Flag Acts are three laws that sought to define the design of the flag of the United States. All the submitted suggestions were remarkably short, the shortest being a sentence of 31 words, and the longest being a title and two sentences of 117 words.

Flag Act of 1777 

The Flag Act of 1777 was passed by the Second Continental Congress on June 14, 1777, in response to a petition made by a Native American nation on June 3 for "an American Flag." As a result, June 14 is now celebrated as Flag Day in the United States.

Text 

Resolved, That the flag of the thirteen United States be thirteen stripes, alternate red and white; that the union be thirteen stars, white in a blue field, representing a new constellation.

Flag Act of 1794 

The Flag Act of 1794 was signed into law by President George Washington on January 13, 1794. It changed the design of the flag to accommodate the admission into the Union of the states of Vermont and Kentucky.  It provided for fifteen stripes as well as fifteen stars. This would be the only official flag of the United States not to have thirteen stripes.

Text

Flag Act of 1818 

The Flag Act of 1818 was enacted by Congress on April 4, 1818.  It provided for the modern rule of having thirteen horizontal stripes and having the number of stars match the current number of states. It also provided that subsequent changes in the number of stars be made on July 4, Independence Day.

As the result of the lack of a Flag Act between 1794 and 1818, there were no official U.S. flags with sixteen, seventeen, eighteen, or nineteen stars.  No flag laws were enacted to accompany the admission of new states to the Union during this period.

Text

References

External links 
 Journals of the Continental Congress, 1774–1789
 Statutes at Large

Flags of the United States
3rd United States Congress
United States federal legislation
United States federal government administration legislation
Ordinances of the Continental Congress